Neme may refer to:

 Nimis, or Neme, a town and commune in Udine, Italy
 Néme, or Nima,  a village in Mintiu Gherlii Commune, Cluj County, Romania
 Neme, one of the Nambu languages of Papua New Guinea
 Laurel Neme, American environmentalist